Kyra Phillips (born August 8, 1968) is a correspondent for ABC News.

Early life and career
Phillips was born in Illinois, and grew up in the city of Jacksonville. In the fourth grade, she moved to San Diego, California, where her parents became professors at San Diego State University. After graduating from Helix High School, Phillips earned a bachelor's degree in journalism from University of Southern California. Among her first jobs in broadcasting were the positions of weekend anchor and reporter for WLUK-TV in Green Bay, Wisconsin before moving on to WDSU-TV in New Orleans, Louisiana in 1994. Phillips has also held positions as morning anchor for KAMC-TV in Lubbock, Texas, field producer for CNN-Telemundo’s Washington, D.C. offices and a journalist of the special assignment unit of KCBS-TV in Los Angeles, California. In addition to her regular duties on HLN, Phillips participates in the Brain Tumor Foundation for Children, T.A.P.S. (Tragedy Assistance Program for Survivors), Global Down Syndrome Foundation and Big Brothers Big Sisters of America, which she has been involved with since 1992.

Career

CNN

Phillips joined CNN in 1999. During her early years at CNN, Phillips was granted access to U.S. Navy Air Wing CVW-9 in 2001 as they prepared for the war in Afghanistan. In January 2002, Phillips spent about a month in Antarctica to work on a television documentary to be featured on the program CNN Presents. Later in 2002, Phillips produced reports focusing on the U.S. Navy’s reconnaissance missions from the destroyer , the Navy's Special Operations Command, the Navy SEALs, and Special Warfare Combatant Crewman training, riding in an F-14 Tomcat during an air-to-air combat mission over the Persian Gulf. She has also participated in the Navy’s TOPGUN school, SWAT training, and other police and weapons training.

In 2003, she was an embedded journalist during the 2003 invasion of Iraq, where she reported from the aircraft carrier . In 2006, Phillips was the last journalist to fly in an F-14 Tomcat before its official retirement from service in the U.S. Navy.

Phillips was criticized for her insensitivity during an April 16, 2003 interview with Dr Imad al-Najada, the doctor of Ali Ismail Abbas, a 12-year-old boy who lost 15 relatives and both arms when a U.S. missile hit his home in Baghdad. Joan Walsh, news editor of Salon.com, wrote:"CNN hit rock bottom on Wednesday morning, when anchor Kyra Phillips interviewed Ali's doctor in Kuwait, Dr Imad al- Najada explained that, although Ali told reporters he was grateful for his treatment, he also hopes no other 'children in the war will suffer like what he suffered'. Phillips seemed shocked by Ali's apparent inability to understand we were only trying to help him. 'Doctor, does he understand why this war took place? Has he talked about Operation Iraqi Freedom and the meaning. Does he understand it?'"Discussing live images of the 2006 labor protests in France, in which it was later determined that no one was killed, she said that the images of the demonstrations "Sort of brings back memories of Tiananmen Square, when you saw these activists in front of tanks." CNN's Chris Burns told French Foreign Minister Philippe Douste-Blazy that her comments were "regrettable."

On a CNN segment aired on April 21, 2005, one of her guests claimed that research showed that it was "a proven fact" that "children in same-sex couple homes are 11 times more likely to be abused sexually."  In an article explaining how dubious and misleading statistics enter the national discourse with little notice, the Wall Street Journal columnist, Carl Bialik, later determined the figure to have been derived from research published in Psychological Reports by Dr. Paul Cameron. Cameron's research has been criticized by other scientists for statistical flaws as well as for being both a researcher and an advocate for anti-gay agendas. Phillips called it a "bold statement" and gave the other guest with an opposing view an immediate opportunity to respond to the assertion. Kelly McBride, ethics group leader at the Poynter Institute, criticized Phillips for failing to challenge the statement, and said it is the responsibility of the anchor to ask pointed questions when such numbers are stated as fact. "This is one of the faults of live TV," McBride said. "It is the anchor’s job to push back. You have to have the skills to question. The idea is not to say 'yes, this is right,' or 'no, this is wrong,' but to give the audience some kind of context of where the research comes from."

On August 29, 2006, during a CNN broadcast of President George W. Bush's speech on the first anniversary of Hurricane Katrina's landfall, Phillips' microphone was left on while she was in the washroom.  Portions of a personal conversation were broadcast live, during which Phillips offered advice on men, criticized her sister-in-law for being a "control freak", and praised her then-husband. The conversation audio was mixed with the President's audio feed and both were discernible. Daryn Kagan broke into Phillips' comments with an audio recap of Bush's speech. CNN immediately apologized for the on-air gaffe.  Phillips later appeared on CBS' Late Show with David Letterman poking fun at herself in retrospect.

Phillips co-anchored CNN Radio's November 4, 2008 election coverage with Capitol Hill correspondent Lisa Desjardins.

In March 2012, Phillips moved to the 11am Newsroom, and her timeslot was shortened to one hour. However, on June 26, 2012, it was officially announced that she would leave CNN and launch her own show at its sister channel HLN.  She soon returned to CNN as an "investigative correspondent".

ABC
On April 2, 2018, Phillips left CNN to join ABC News as a "D.C.-based correspondent".

On July 19, 2019, Phillips posted a tweet praising President Trump for "giving us [journalists] access on a regular basis and the ability to ask any question." Phillips came under attack by many who viewed the comment as being a "suck up" to the president.

Awards
In 1997 Phillips was named Reporter of the Year by the Associated Press. She has also won four Emmy Awards, two Edward R. Murrow Awards for investigative reporting, the top documentary award from the Society of Professional Journalists for her coverage of Jena, Louisiana and multiple Golden Microphones.

Personal life
Having been married to John Assad from 2000 to 2008, Phillips became engaged to Fox News correspondent John Roberts in 2010.  She gave birth to their twins in March 2011.

References

External links

1968 births
American television reporters and correspondents
CNN people
Living people
Television anchors from Los Angeles
Television anchors from New Orleans
People from San Diego